The World Council for Renewable Energy defends, develops, and promotes policies on the multinational, governmental, regional and individual levels in favor of the use of natural and renewable forms of energy to replace fossil and nuclear energy.

Hermann Scheer was the general chairman of the Council.  He died in October 2010.

References

External links
 Official Website

International renewable energy organizations